Sporting Clube de Benguela, in short Sporting de Benguela, was a basketball club from Angola. The club, based in the city of Benguela, the capital of the namesake province, was founded on November 16, 1915, as the 21st affiliate of Sporting Clube de Portugal.

The club's men's basketball team made its debut in the Angolan top tier basketball league (BAI Basket) in 2013, after winning the 2013 Angolan Second Division championship. They went on to participate in 2014, 2015 and 2016.

In 2017, the basketball team withdrew from official competitions for financial reasons.

Players

2014–2016

See also
Sporting de Benguela Football

References

External links
 Africabasket profile

Sports clubs in Angola
Basketball teams established in 1915
Defunct basketball teams in Angola
Basketball teams disestablished in 2017
1915 establishments in Africa
2017 disestablishments in Africa